Rajdharpur Madhyamik Bidyalay (abbreviated RMB) also known as Rajdharpur High School is a secondary school in Rajdharpur, Baliakandi, Rajbari, Bangladesh. It was started as a junior high school in 1968, and then it was upgraded to a high school in 1973. This school was founded by education personnel, well-wiser and social worker Abdul Gofur Molla. 

Rajdharpur Madhyamik Bidyalay's institute code (EIIN) is 113253. It's co-education type is combined. The institute's MPO number is 3301021302. It has one shift. This school operates independently by the School Managing Committee (SMC).

History 
After elected as the Chairman of Islampur Union in 1960 Abdul Gofur Molla started Rajdharpur High School in 1961 with the dream of a high school along with various developments in Rajdharpur. Mollah was in overall charge of the school. That time the headmaster was the Khoshedur Rahman.  The school was closed again in 1964 due to non-receipt of official recognition in time. Abdul Razzak Mollah started it again as Haji Kachai Mollah Lower Secondary School in 1967 with the dream of rebuilding the school. But Razzak Mollah left because he had a job elsewhere. In 1967, the name of the school was again changed to Rajdharpur Lower Secondary School. It got official recognition from January 1, 1968, and the school was functioning as a lower secondary school till 1972. From January 1, 1972, ninth class was opened in Rajdharpur Lower Secondary School.  The local people started trying to develop the school in many different ways.  Finally, on January 1, 1973, it received official approval.

Alumni association 

It was formed in 1990. The aim of this nonprofit organization is mainly to organize reunions amongst the ex-students of this school, provide financial aid to impoverished students and work with the school to improve its facilities. Every year after Eid al-Adha this organization organized a culture program titled Eid Full-fledged Ceremony.

Notable alumni 

 Md. Shahjahan Ali Mollah, Bangladesh Public Service Commission (PSC) member and ex-secretary to the Bangladesh Government.

 Muhammad Shahidul Islam, Vice President, NCC Bank.

References

External links
Official  website
 Official Facebook page
 Official Twitter page
 Official LinkedIn page

Schools in Bangladesh
Rajbari District
High schools in Bangladesh